Borisovo may refer to the following places:

Orekhovo-Borisovo Severnoye District, Moscow, Russia
Orekhovo-Borisovo Yuzhnoye District, Moscow, Russia
Borisovo (Moscow Metro), a station of the Moscow Metro, Russia
Borisovo, Russia, the name of several rural localities in Russia
Borisovo, Novo Selo, a village in North Macedonia